Kelly Renée Gissendaner (née Brookshire; March 8, 1968 – September 30, 2015) was an American woman who was executed by the U.S. state of Georgia. Gissendaner had been convicted of orchestrating the murder of her husband, Douglas Gissendaner (December 14, 1966 – February 7, 1997). At the time of the murder, Gissendaner was 28, and her husband was 30. After her conviction, and until her execution, Gissendaner was the only woman on death row in Georgia.

Early life and family
Gissendaner was born into a poor cotton-farming family.

According to sworn affidavits by friends and family members, she was molested by her stepfather and other men during her childhood and adolescence. During her senior year of high school, she claimed to have been date raped. Nine months later, her first son was born. In 1987, at the age of 19, Kelly Gissendaner married her first husband Jeff Banks. They stayed together for six months.

Kelly married Douglas Gissendaner for the first time on September 2, 1989. They had a baby together, lost their jobs, and moved in with Kelly's mother. Douglas joined the Army and they were sent to Germany. Kelly became pregnant by another man who later died of cancer. She and Douglas were divorced in 1993. In May 1995, she remarried Douglas. In December 1996, the couple bought a house together in Auburn, Georgia.

Kelly, in addition to her daughter with Douglas, had two sons. Douglas was the stepfather to her sons.

Crime

Murder
On February 7, 1997, Gregory Bruce Owen (born March 17, 1971) hid near the couple's home in Auburn. When Douglas arrived, Owen forced Douglas into his car at knifepoint and drove him to a wooded area in Gwinnett County near Harbins Park. After striking Douglas in the head with a nightstick, Owen stabbed Douglas in the neck and back multiple times. When Kelly arrived at the scene moments later, the two set fire to her husband's car and hid the body in the woods.

Trial
Before trial, prosecutors offered both Owen and Gissendaner a plea deal of life in prison and no chance of parole for twenty-five years. Gissendaner, however, rejected the plea deal.

Gissendaner was convicted of orchestrating her husband's murder and sentenced to death in 1998, after Owen testified against her in a plea agreement in which he was sentenced to life imprisonment. Owen told a jury that Gissendaner had first approached him about "a way to get rid of" her husband three months before the murder. He further testified that Gissendaner thought murder was the only way to get Douglas out of her life and still get the house and a payoff from his life insurance policy. During the trial, Gissendaner was discovered to have threatened witnesses and also plotted to pay a witness to commit perjury.

Prison

Ministry
After being sentenced to death, Gissendaner resided in Metro State Prison until it was closed in 2011. She was then transferred to Arrendale State Prison. While in prison, Gissendaner had a conversion to Christianity. During her time in prison, Gissendaner ministered to other women living in prison with her.

A group of women who were incarcerated with Gissendaner formed a group called the "Struggle Sisters" after they were released from prison. Gissendaner had spoken to the women through an air vent and prevented some from committing suicide, while other women tell of how Gissendaner's words encouraged them to turn their lives around. The women released a video detailing the impact Gissendaner had on their lives.

Theology studies
In 2010, Gissendaner enrolled in a theology studies program for prisoners, run by a consortium of Atlanta-area divinity schools, including the divinity school at Emory University.

During theology studies, she became a student of Christian thinkers like Dietrich Bonhoeffer and Rowan Williams. Gissendaner developed a friendship with Jürgen Moltmann while she was in prison. Gissendaner sent Moltmann a paper which she had written on Bonhoeffer. He was impressed with her paper, and he wrote back. After that, the two became penpals exchanging letters about theology and faith. Gissendaner completed a theological degree program through Emory University.

Execution

Gissendaner's execution was scheduled for February 25, 2015, when a winter storm delayed it until March 2, 2015. Her execution was further delayed when one of the execution drugs (pentobarbital) was thought to have been spoiled through improper storage, though it was later determined that the drug had merely precipitated out of solution due to colder than recommended storage conditions.

Archbishop Carlo Maria Viganò, on behalf of Pope Francis, urged the Georgia State Board of Pardons and Paroles to spare Gissendaner's life. Gissendaner's clemency application to the Board of Pardons included support from a number of correctional officers whom she had met while in prison. Norman S. Fletcher, the former Chief Justice of the Supreme Court of Georgia, urged clemency because capital punishment was not proportional to her crime. The Georgia Republican Party's general counsel and Republican Bob Barr also supported clemency.

The board again declined to commute her sentence on September 29, 2015. (Georgia is one of three US states in which the governor is not empowered to grant clemency to the condemned.)

Gissendaner was scheduled to be executed on September 29, 2015, but was again delayed by appeals. She was finally executed by lethal injection at the Georgia Diagnostic and Classification Prison in Jackson, Georgia, on September 30 at 12:21 a.m.

Gissendaner cried, prayed, sang "Amazing Grace", and said, "...and I love you Sally. And I love you Susan. You let my kids know I went out singing Amazing Grace. And tell the Gissendaner family I am so sorry. That amazing man lost his life because of me and if I could take it back, if this would change it, I would have done it a long time ago. But it's not. And I just hope they can find peace. And I hope they find some happiness. God bless you."

She was the first woman executed in Georgia since 1945, as well as the only woman executed in the United States in 2015.

See also
 Capital punishment in Georgia (U.S. state)
 List of people executed in Georgia (U.S. state)
 List of people executed in the United States in 2015
 List of women executed in the United States since 1976

References

External links

Attorney General of Georgia Official Press Releases on Execution
findagrave match result page
Struggle Sisters and Kelly Gissendaner via YouTube
Kelly Gissendaner - #kellyonmymind on Facebook
Profile of Kelly Gissendaner  at About.com

1968 births
2015 deaths
1997 murders in the United States
People from Lawrenceville, Georgia
People convicted of murder by Georgia (U.S. state)
Executed American women
American people executed for murder
People executed by Georgia (U.S. state) by lethal injection
21st-century executions by Georgia (U.S. state)
American Christians
American female murderers
Mariticides
Emory University alumni
20th-century American criminals